Cleve Gray (September 22, 1918 – December 8, 2004) was an American Abstract expressionist painter, who was also associated with Color Field painting and Lyrical Abstraction.

Early life and education
Gray was born Cleve Ginsberg: the family changed their name to Gray in 1936.  Gray attended the Ethical Culture School in New York City (1924–1932). From the age of 11 until the age of 14 he had his first formal art training with Antonia Nell, who had been a student of George Bellows. From 15 to 18 he attended the Phillips Academy, in Andover, Massachusetts; where he studied painting with Bartlett Hayes and won the Samuel F. B. Morse Prize for most promising art student. In 1940 he graduated from Princeton University summa cum laude, with a degree in Art and Archeology.  He was a member of Phi Beta Kappa.  At Princeton he studied painting with James C. Davis and Far Eastern Art with George Rowley, under whose supervision he wrote his thesis on Yuan dynasty landscape painting.

Professional work
After graduation in 1941 Gray moved to Tucson, Arizona. In Arizona he exhibited his landscape paintings and still lifes at the Alfred Messer Studio Gallery in Tucson. In 1942 he returned to New York and joined the United States Army. During World War II, he served in the signal intelligence service in Britain, France and Germany, where he rose to the rank of sergeant. In Germany he sketched wartime destruction.  After the liberation of Paris he was the first American GI to greet Pablo Picasso and Gertrude Stein.  He began informal art training with the French artists André Lhote and Jacques Villon, continuing his art studies in Paris after the war.

Gray returned to the United States in 1946. During the Post-war period he began to exhibit his work at the Galerie Durand-Ruel in Paris, and he had his first solo exhibition at the Jacques Seligmann Gallery in New York in 1947. In 1949 he moved to the house his parents had owned on a  property in Warren, Connecticut, and lived there for the rest of his life. He married the noted author Francine du Plessix on April 23, 1957. They worked in separate studios in two outbuildings with a driveway in between.

Gray was a veteran of scores of exhibitions throughout his career, as listed below, from the early days Tucson, through to postwar Paris and New York, and most recently in 2002 at the Berry-Hill Gallery in New York City. His paintings are held in the collections of numerous prominent museums and institutions.  In 2009 the art critic Karen Wilkin curated a posthumous retrospective of his work at the Boca Raton Museum of Art, Florida, and other posthumous exhibitions have been held.

Death
His wife of 47 years, Francine du Plessix Gray, reported that he died of a "massive subdural hematoma suffered after he fell on ice and hit his head."

Museum collections

Addison Gallery of American Art, Phillips Academy, Andover, Massachusetts
Albright-Knox Art Gallery, Buffalo, New York
Boca Raton Museum of Art, Boca Raton, Florida
The Brooklyn Museum, New York City
Cathedral of St. John the Divine Art Gallery, New York City
Columbia University Art Gallery, New York City
Columbus Museum of Art, Ohio
The Corcoran Gallery of Art, Washington, D.C.
Grey Art Gallery and Study Center, New York University, New York City
Solomon R. Guggenheim Museum, New York City
Honolulu Museum of Art, Honolulu, Hawaii
The Jewish Museum, New York City
Krannert Art Museum, University of Illinois, Champaign
The Metropolitan Museum of Art, New York City
Museum of Art, Rhode Island School of Design, Providence
Museum of Fine Arts, Boston
Museum of Fine Arts, Houston
Museum of Modern Art, New York City
The Neuberger Museum, State University of New York at Purchase
New Britain Museum of American Art, Connecticut
The Newark Museum, New Jersey
Norton Gallery of Art, West Palm Beach, Florida
Oklahoma City Art Center, Oklahoma
The Phillips Collection, Washington, D.C.
The Art Museum, Princeton University, New Jersey
Rose Art Museum, Brandeis University, Waltham, Massachusetts
Sheldon Museum of Art, University of Nebraska, Lincoln
Smithsonian American Art Museum, Washington, D.C.
The Wadsworth Atheneum, Hartford, Connecticut
Whitney Museum of American Art, New York City
Willard Gibbs Research Laboratory, Yale University, New Haven, Connecticut
Williams College Museum of Art, Williamstown, Massachusetts
Yale University Art Gallery, New Haven, Connecticut

Publications
Contributing editor for Art in America, from 1960
Editor, David Smith by David Smith, Holt, Rinehart & Winston (1968)
Editor, John Marin by John Marin, Holt, Rinehart & Winston (1970)
Editor, Hans Richter by Hans Richter, Holt, Rinehart & Winston (1971)

References

Further reading 
 

Buck, Robert. Cleve Gray Works on Paper 1940-1986, The Brooklyn Museum, New York, 1986

1918 births
2004 deaths
20th-century American painters
American male painters
21st-century American painters
American abstract artists
Abstract expressionist artists
United States Army personnel of World War II
Military personnel from New York City
Princeton University alumni
Painters from New York City
People from Warren, Connecticut
Artists from Tucson, Arizona
United States Army soldiers
20th-century American male artists
Members of the American Academy of Arts and Letters